Wheelchair Tennis at the 2004 Summer Paralympics was staged at the Olympic Tennis Centre from September 19 to September 26.

There were singles and doubles competitions for men, women and quads. All matches were played to the best of three sets.

Participating countries

Medal table

Medal summary

Source: Paralympic.org

See also
Tennis at the 2004 Summer Olympics

References

 

 
2004 Summer Paralympics events
2004
Paralympics